Sri Lanka is scheduled to compete at the 2022 World Championships in Athletics in Eugene, Oregon, United States, from July 15−24, 2022.

Sri Lanka qualified three athletes (one man and two women).

Results
Track and road events

Non-competing athlete
National record holder in the women's long jump Sarangi Silva qualified to compete after the withdrawal of a couple of athletes. Silva would have become the first Sri Lankan to compete in a jumping discipline at the World Athletics Championships for the country. However, Silva decided to decline her place to focus on the 2022 Commonwealth Games.

See also
Sri Lanka at the 2022 Commonwealth Games

References

Nations at the 2022 World Athletics Championships
World Championships in Athletics
2022